"Don't Save It All for Christmas Day" is a song by Canadian singer Celine Dion from her first English-language Christmas album, These Are Special Times (1998). The song was written by Peter Zizzo, Ric Wake and Dion, while Wake also served as its producer. The pop ballad was issued as a promotional single on 4 December 2000, two years after album's original release.

The song has also been covered by many artists over the years, including Christian group Avalon, who re-recorded the song for their 2000 album Joy: A Christmas Collection. It is most associated with Clay Aiken, as it has been his signature Christmas song since he recorded it for his 2004 album Merry Christmas with Love.

Background
"Don't Save It All for Christmas Day" is one out of seven original compositions Dion recorded for These Are Special Times. Aside from "Treat Her Like a Lady", a cover of the Diana King song, that she had partially re-written and recorded for 1997 studio album Let's Talk About Love, "Don't Save It All for Christmas Day" marked her first co-writing credit on one of her own recordings. Unaware of the fact that it was not someone else's record she was continually singing to, Dion had the melody and lyrics of the song's pre-chorus ("How many people are crying / people are dying / how many people are asking for love") for nearly two years in her head. While she never finished it as she was "afraid of the reaction", her husband and manager René Angélil suggested that it would make a "great record" after hearing it. At a dinner with frequent collaborator Rick Wake after her performance at the VH1 Divas Live show in New York City in April 1998, Wake convinced Dion to sing her ideas of a verse and a chorus on his home answering machine. While Dion's lines inspired the song and its whole approach, Wake consulted Peter Zizzo to polish Dion's track. Based on her lyrics, the songwriter came up with the chorus lines "Don't save It all for Christmas Day". Lyrically, the ballad is about sharing good-will and love throughout the year, not just during the holiday season.

Critical reception
Billboard editor Paul Verna called this song 'thoughtful produced original composition, her first co-writing credit'.

Formats and track listings
Promo CD single
"Don't Save It All for Christmas Day" (Album Version) – 4:37
"Don't Save It All for Christmas Day" (Radio Version) – 4:19

Credits and personnel 
Credits adapted from the These Are Special Times liner notes.

 Vocals – Celine Dion
 Arrangement – Ric Wake, Peter Zizzo
 Engineering – Jesse Shatkin, Alex Pasco
 Background vocals – Nancey Jackson
 Bass, drum, programming – Peter Zizzo

 Drum programming – Jim Bralower
 Guitar – Larry Salzman, Marc Shulman, Peter Zizzo
 Hammond B3 organ, background vocal arrangement – Loris Holland
 Mixing – Humberto GaticaNoguchi
 Synth programming – Jeff Bova

Charts

References

Celine Dion songs
NSYNC songs
2000 singles
Songs written by Ric Wake
Songs written by Celine Dion
Christmas songs
Pop ballads
1998 songs
Song recordings produced by Ric Wake
Columbia Records singles
Epic Records singles
Songs written by Peter Zizzo
1990s ballads